Euproserpinus is a genus of sphinx moth in the family Sphingidae. The genus was erected by Augustus Radcliffe Grote and Herbert C. Robinson in 1865.

Species
Euproserpinus euterpe Edwards, 1888
Euproserpinus phaeton Grote & Robinson, 1865
Euproserpinus wiesti Sperry, 1939

References

 
Macroglossini
Taxa named by Augustus Radcliffe Grote
Taxa named by Herbert C. Robinson
Taxonomy articles created by Polbot